Victoria Building may refer to:
 Victoria Building (Ottawa), Canada
 Victoria Building, University of Liverpool, United Kingdom
 Victoria Building, St. Louis, Missouri